Caenorhabditis sp. 8 is an unnamed species of nematodes, in the same genus as the model organism Caenorhabditis elegans. It was collected from rotting tomatoes in New Jersey, USA, in July 2007.

This species groups near the C. angaria/C. castelli branch in the 'Drosophilae' supergroup in phylogenetic studies.

References 

 Caenorhabditis sp. 8 at Caenorhabditis Genetics Center, University of Minnesota

Undescribed animal species
sp. 8